Sir James Risdon Bennett (29 September 1809 – 24 December 1891) was an English physician.

Life
The eldest son of the Rev. James Bennett, a nonconformist minister, he was born at Romsey on 29 September 1809. He received his education at Rotherham College, Yorkshire, of which his father became principal; and at the age of fifteen was apprenticed to Thomas Waterhouse of Sheffield. In 1830 he went to Paris, and then to Edinburgh, where he graduated M.D. in 1833.

In the autumn of 1833 Bennett accompanied Lord Beverley to Rome, and spent two or three summers in his company and that of Lord Aberdeen. On his return to England in 1837 he became physician to the Aldersgate Street dispensary, and lectured on medicine at the Charing Cross Hospital medical school, and also at Grainger's school of medicine.

In 1843 Bennett was appointed assistant physician to St. Thomas's Hospital, and in 1849 full physician. On the foundation of the City of London Hospital for Diseases of the Chest in 1848 he was appointed physician there; and from 1843 to its dissolution in 1867 acted as secretary to the Sydenham Society. He was made a Fellow of the Royal College of Physicians in 1846 .  In 1850 he was President of the Medical Society of London. In 1875, he was elected Fellow of the Royal Society.

Settling in Finsbury Square on his marriage in 1841, he had success as a consultant, especially in connection with chest diseases, an early adopter of the stethoscope. In 1876 he was elected President of the Royal College of Physicians, the first non Oxford or Cambridge graduate since its inception, and held the post for 5 years.  He was knighted in 1881. He then moved to Cavendish Square, where he died on 14 December 1891.

He was the Lumleian Lecturer in 1870 on "Cancer and Cancerous Growths."

Works
Bennett's published works included:

 a translation of Wilhelm Kramer on Diseases of the Ear, 1837; 
 Acute Hydrocephalus, an essay which obtained the Fothergillian gold medal of the Medical Society of London in 1842, and was published in following year; and 
 Intra-thoracic Tumours, 1872, Lumleian Lectures.

Family
Bennett married, in June 1841, Ellen Selfe, daughter of the Rev. Henry Page of Rose Hill, Worcester, by whom he had nine children, of whom six survived.

Notes

Attribution

1809 births
1891 deaths
19th-century English medical doctors
Fellows of the Royal Society
Presidents of the Royal College of Physicians